Jacob Mulee (born 1968), nicknamed Ghost, is a Kenyan association football coach. He also works as a radio host for Radio Jambo.

Career
Mulee coached Kenyan club side Tusker between 1999 and 2009, winning the Kenyan Premier League title three times. He later coached APR of Rwanda and Young Africans of Tanzania.

Mulee first took charge of Kenya between 2003 and 2004, including at the 2004 African Cup of Nations. Mulee returned for a brief second spell in 2005, which lasted just one day from 16 to 17 December. Mulee returned to Kenya for a third time in March 2007. Mulee's fourth stint in charge of Kenya began in September 2010. Mulee quit the role in December 2010 following a run of three defeats in the 2010 CECAFA Cup.

In October 2020, he returned to coach the Kenyan national team for a fifth time. He was sacked by the KFF in September 2021.

References

1968 births
Living people
Kenyan footballers
Kenyan football managers
2004 African Cup of Nations managers
Association footballers not categorized by position
Kenya national football team managers
APR F.C. managers
Young Africans S.C. managers